Guildford Kings was a successful British basketball franchise, most prominent in the British Basketball League (BBL) during the early 1990s. They ceased operations at the end of the 1993–94 season.

History
The franchise's origins date back to the London YMCA Metros who entered the National Basketball League in 1973. The Metros enjoyed several successful seasons and a variety of exotic names - due to sponsorship naming deals - throughout the 1970s, but in 1979, owner Malcolm Chamberlain uprooted the team and relocated them from London to the suburbs of Kingston upon Thames and to the Tolworth Recreation Centre, and rebranding as Kingston.

Kingston were one of the first entrants into the new Carlsberg League, finishing second in the inaugural 1987–88 British Basketball League season. In 1988, the franchise was bought out by Rangers F.C., and became the Glasgow Rangers, although the team played in Falkirk. Rangers were League Champions in 1988–89, but were sold off after just one year and returned to Kingston, where the franchise enjoyed their most glorious period. From 1989 to 1992, they won every League Championship as well as many other trophies and competitions. In 1992 the franchise was moved yet again to the brand new Spectrum Arena in Guildford to become the Guildford Kings. The Kings competed for two more years in the British Basketball League and even European competitions, until 1994, when the franchise folded completely due to the club being unable to negotiate a viable contract with the owners of the Guildford Spectrum. The league sold Kings' licence to a group headed by Robert Earl, Ed Simons and Harvey Goldsmith, who went on to establish the equally successful Leopards franchise.

Professional basketball returned to Guildford in 2005 with the creation of Guildford Heat.

Club basketball remains in Kingston with the Kingston Wildcats School of Basketball, a community basketball development club that practices and plays its home fixtures at Chessington School, competing in the Surrey League and Basketball England National League.

Season-by-season records

References

See also
British Basketball League
Guildford Heat
Guildford Spectrum
Leopards
Kingston Wildcats School of Basketball

Defunct basketball teams in the United Kingdom
Sport in Guildford
Sports clubs founded by the YMCA
Sport in Falkirk
Basketball teams established in 1973
Basketball teams disestablished in 1994
1994 disestablishments in England
1974 establishments in England
Basketball in London
Sport in the Royal Borough of Kingston upon Thames
Former British Basketball League teams